Christophe Prémont (born 22 November 1989) is a Belgian former professional road cyclist.

Major results

2007
 9th Chrono des Nations Juniors
2010
 1st Road race, Wallonia Regional Under-23 Road Championships
 1st Stage 7 Tour du Faso
2011
 1st Road race, Wallonia Regional Road Championships
 4th Paris–Tours Espoirs
 5th Grote 1-MeiPrijs
2012
 1st Grote 1-MeiPrijs
2014
 4th Omloop Het Nieuwsblad U23
2015
 1st Stage 1 (TTT) Paris–Arras Tour
 1st Stage 1 Giro della Regione Friuli Venezia Giulia
 3rd Overall Ronde van Midden-Nederland
1st Stage 1 (TTT)
 5th Dwars door de Vlaamse Ardennen
2016
 9th Duo Normand (with Elias Van Breussegem)

References

External links

1989 births
Living people
Belgian male cyclists
People from Uccle
Cyclists from Brussels